Thick as Thieves is Cavo's second major label (and third studio) album, released on April 10, 2012 on Eleven Seven.

Track listing

Charts

References

External links
 http://www.cavomusic.com/
 https://www.youtube.com/watch?v=XPI_Vdwe_5M&feature=relmfu
 https://www.youtube.com/watch?v=NtxJmbxI-84

2012 albums
Cavo albums
Eleven Seven Label Group albums